Jacques Germeaux (born 11 May 1956) is a doctor and a Belgian politician of the Flemish Liberals and Democrats (VLD).

He studied medicine at the Vrije Universiteit Brussel (Free University of Brussels).

Since 1995 he is a member of the local council in the city of Genk. He became a member of the Belgian Chamber of Representatives on 10 October 2001. After the national elections of 2003, he was appointed as Senator.

References

1956 births
Living people
Members of the Chamber of Representatives (Belgium)
People from Genk